Kaposvölgye VSC is a Hungarian football team in Nagyberki.

Squad

References 

Football clubs in Hungary
1936 establishments in Hungary